James Barraclough (26 November 1923 – 25 November 2002) was an English professional rugby league footballer who played in the 1940s and 1950s.

Background
Jim Barraclough was born in Featherstone, West Riding of Yorkshire, England, and he died aged 79 in Hull, East Riding of Yorkshire, England.

Playing career

International honours
Jim Barraclough won a cap for England while at Hull Kingston Rovers in 1950 against Wales.

Club career
Barraclough made his début for Featherstone Rovers on Saturday 4 December 1954.

References

1923 births
2002 deaths
England national rugby league team players
English rugby league players
Featherstone Rovers players
Hull Kingston Rovers players
Rugby league players from Featherstone
Rugby league second-rows